The following low-power television stations broadcast on digital or analog channel 46 in the United States:

 K46HZ-D in Bonners Ferry, Idaho, to move to channel 17
 K46KI-D in Woody Creek, Colorado, to move to channel 14

The following television stations, which are no longer licensed, formerly broadcast on digital or analog channel 46 in the United States:
 K46BY-D in Capulin, etc., New Mexico
 K46CT in Woodland, Utah
 K46DY in Bismarck, North Dakota
 K46EH in Fairbanks, Alaska
 K46EI in Fillmore/Meadow, etc., Utah
 K46FB-D in Austin, Nevada
 K46FI in Grants, New Mexico
 K46GF in Santa Maria, California
 K46GY in Santa Fe, New Mexico
 K46HW-D in Preston, Idaho
 K46JY in Kemmerer, Wyoming
 K46KH in Carlin, Nevada
 K46MX-D in Lowry, South Dakota
 KAZJ-LP in Norfolk, Nebraska
 KHLU-CD in Honolulu, Hawaii
 KMKI-LD in Cedar Falls, Iowa
 KPBI-CA in Fort Smith, Arkansas
 KPMT-LP in Pullman, Washington
 KQVE-LP in La Vernia, Texas
 KRYM-LP in Raymondville, Texas
 KTCD-LP in San Diego, California
 KTXC-LP in Canyon, Texas
 KXWL-LP in Keokuk, Iowa
 W46AX-D in Bryson City, North Carolina
 W46CF in Tuscumbia, Alabama
 W46CW in Jackson/Brandon, Mississippi
 W46EO-D in Culebra, Puerto Rico
 W46IT-D in Port Henry, New York
 WBKM-LP in Chana, Illinois
 WDLE-LP in Pigeon Forge, Tennessee
 WLOT-LP in Watertown, New York
 WQVC-CD in Greensburg, Pennsylvania
 WUEM-LD in Athens, Georgia
 WVEA-LP in Tampa, Florida
 WWEK-LD in Augusta, Georgia
 WXSX-CA in Savannah, Georgia

References

46 low-power